Jos Schipper (born 10 June 1951) is a former Dutch racing cyclist. He rode in four Grand Tours between 1978 and 1982.

References

External links

1951 births
Living people
Dutch male cyclists
Sportspeople from Utrecht (city)
Cyclists from Utrecht (province)